David Harris was a stone mason in Madison County, Iowa in the 1800s.  He was born in Wales.

A number of his works are listed on the U.S. National Register of Historic Places.

Works 
Works include:
John and Amanda Bigler Drake House (built 1856), 11 mi. W of Winterset on IA 92 Winterset, IA Harris, David
Duff Barn, 1 1/2 mi. N of Winterset on US 169 Winterset, IA Harris, David
Emily Hornback House, 605 N. First St. Winterset, IA Harris, David
McDonald House, 3 1/2 mi. W of Winterset off IA 92 Winterset, IA Harris, David
William Anzi Nichols House, 1 mi. E of Winterset on IA 92 Winterset, IA Harris, David
William Ogburn House, 1 1/2 mi. N of East Peru East Peru, IA Harris, David
William R. and Martha Foster Shriver House, 616 E. Court Ave. Winterset, IA Harris, David
Sprague, Brown, and Knowlton Store, First and Court Winterset, IA Harris, David

References

American stonemasons
People from Madison County, Iowa
Year of death missing
Year of birth missing